Honokawa Dam  is a rockfill dam located in Miyagi Prefecture in Japan. The dam is used for irrigation. The catchment area of the dam is 2.5 km2. The dam impounds about 5  ha of land when full and can store 360 thousand cubic meters of water. The construction of the dam was started on 1981 and completed in 1999.

See also
List of dams in Japan

References

Dams in Miyagi Prefecture